Tuvalu sent a team to the 2014 Commonwealth Games in Glasgow, Scotland from July 23 to August 3, 2014. It comprised five athletes in two sports: table tennis and weightlifting. The country remained medalless after its fifth Commonwealth Games.

Table tennis

Singles

Doubles

Weightlifting

See also
Tuvalu at the 2014 Summer Youth Olympics

References

Nations at the 2014 Commonwealth Games
2014
Commonwealth Games